Lela Loren (born 7 May 1980) is an American television and film actress. Known for her leading role as Angela Valdes on the Starz television series, Power,
 Loren notes in interview that it took time to land her first audition, and that her early roles were in The Shield, Gang Related, and shows of the CSI franchise. Further television roles followed, including in Cold Case, and Ghost Whisperer, and she went on to film roles, including in The Hangover Part III and Reign Over Me. In 2019, Loren joined the second season of the Netflix science fiction series, Altered Carbon as a series regular, playing the character of Danica Harlan.

Early life
Loren was born Maria Loren Avellaneda Sharp on May 7, 1980, in Sacramento, California. She has one sibling, an older brother, Daniel Sharp, who is the executive chef at a small restaurant in New York City. Her mother is of Mexican descent, received her college degree in her 40s, and became a teacher; her father, an American, was working as an economist at the time he married her mother. She spent her childhood in Sacramento, California, and later, in suburban Sacramento, although spending summers in an area of her mother's heritage, in Mexico. Loren has stated that, despite her mom being from Michoacán, Mexico, she did not learn Spanish until she was 10 years old, and that doing so helped her to communicate with relatives when she would return to the village from which her mother came. From early childhood, Loren had surrounded herself with an array of pets, and had intended a career in biology. Loren went to an all-girls' high school, where she was a member of a men's rowing team.

Loren attended the Whitman College, in Walla Walla, Washington, where she majored in biology. She "begrudgingly fell in love" with acting after enrolling in a fine arts course "to get it out of the way", only to find herself moved to an entry level acting class when the arts class was full. It is reported that she did work on a commercial fishing boat in Alaska as a means to pay her college expenses. She graduated with a B.A. in theatre, in 2002. She also studied performing arts at the Ruskin School of Acting. From her upbringing and studies, Loren is fluent in English, Spanish, and Italian.

Career

Television work
Loren notes that it took three years for her to land her first acting audition, and that she "paid her dues with small roles"—in The Shield, Gang Related, and shows of the CSI franchise. Further television roles followed, including in Cold Case and Ghost Whisperer. Loren began a leading role as Angela Valdes on the Starz television series, Power.

In 2019, Loren joined the second season of the Netflix science fiction series, Altered Carbon, as a series regular, playing the character of Danica Harlan.

Film work
Loren has had various film roles, including in The Hangover Part III and Reign Over Me.

Stage work
In 2009, Loren played the lead role, Flora, at the American Conservatory Theater in José Rivera's Boleros for the Disenchanted. She also starred as Antonia in a stage production of My Antonia at Pacific Resident Theatre.

Filmography

Film

Television

Personal life

Loren also writes poems, which is part of her process of getting into character.

References

External links 
 
 Lela Loren on Instagram

 

1980 births
Living people
21st-century American actresses
Actresses from Sacramento, California
American actresses of Mexican descent
American people of Italian descent
American television actresses